NORRA or Norra may refer to:
 Nordic Regional Airlines, a Finnish airline operating on behalf of, and formerly majority-owned by, Finnair
 National Off-Road Racing Association, a desert off-road racing association
 Norra (village), a place in Estonia